Ian Blease (born 1 January 1965) is an English former professional rugby league footballer who played as a  or  for Salford and Swinton. He also represented Lancashire on one occasion in 1991.

Playing career

Representative honours
Blease played one match for Lancashire in September 1991 against Yorkshire at Headingley.

County Cup Final appearances
Blease played as an interchange/substitute, i.e. number 14, (replacing  Peter Williams) in Salford's 17–22 defeat by Wigan in the 1988 Lancashire County Cup Final during the 1988–89 season at Knowsley Road, St. Helens on Sunday 23 October 1988, and played right-, i.e. number 12, was captain, and scored a try in the 18–24 defeat by Widnes in the 1990 Lancashire County Cup Final during the 1990–91 season at Central Park, Wigan on Saturday 29 September 1990.

Club career
Born in the Swinton suburb in the city of Salford, Blease joined Salford in 1985. He became the team's captain in 1990, and went on to make 252 appearances for the club before moving to Swinton in January 1998.

Post-playing career
In November 2016 Blease was brought back to the club by Salford's former owner Marwan Koukash as Chief Executive Officer.

References

1965 births
Living people
English rugby league players
Lancashire rugby league team players
Rugby league players from Swinton, Greater Manchester
Rugby league props
Rugby league second-rows
Salford Red Devils captains
Salford Red Devils players
Swinton Lions players